The following article is a summary of the 2014–15 football season in France, which was the 81st season of competitive football in the country and ran from July 2014 to June 2015.

League tables

Ligue 1

Ligue 2

Championnat National

Championnat de France Amateur

References

 
Seasons in French football